Shelley Meals is an American television writer and producer. She is currently an Executive Producer on Shadow and Bone (TV series).  She has also worked on See, Sweet Magnolias, Chicago Med, Stitchers, Witches of East End, King & Maxwell, Rizzoli & Isles, Wild Card, Strong Medicine, Time of Your Life, Push, Dawson's Creek, Fame L.A., Dangerous Minds, and New York Undercover.

Television credits

Writing
 Shadow and Bone (TV series)
 See
 Sweet Magnolias
 Chicago Med
 Stitchers
 Witches of East End
 King & Maxwell
 Rizzoli & Isles
Sweet Magnolias
HawthoRNe
Strong Medicine
Wild Card
The Young and the Restless
Time of Your Life
Push
Dawson's Creek
Fame L.A.
Dangerous Minds
New York Undercover

Producing
 Shadow and Bone (TV series)
 See
 Sweet Magnolias
 Chicago Med
 Stitchers
 Witches of East End
 King & Maxwell
HawthoRNe
Sweet Magnolias
Strong Medicine
Time of Your Life
Dawson's Creek

References

External links

American soap opera writers
American television producers
American women television producers
Living people
American women television writers
Place of birth missing (living people)
Year of birth missing (living people)
Women soap opera writers
21st-century American women